The Scout and Guide movement in Cameroon is served by two organisations

 Association des Guides du Cameroun, member of the World Association of Girl Guides and Girl Scouts
 Les Scouts du Cameroun, member of the World Organization of the Scout Movement

See also